is a 1994 fighting arcade game developed and published by ADK with the assistance of SNK. It was originally released for the Neo Geo MVS arcade cabinet on April 26, 1994. It is the sequel to the 1993 fighting arcade game World Heroes 2, as well as the third title of the World Heroes series.

It was followed by a sequel released over a year later titled World Heroes Perfect.

Gameplay 

World Heroes 2 Jet shares many elements with its predecessor, such as the same three out of four button layout ("A" to punch, "B" to kick, and "C" to either throw or "Challenge", which is taunting), movements and motion commands performed using an 8-way joystick.  New additions include three new characters and new and modified moves and fighting statistics added to the playable characters returning from the first two World Heroes titles. Also, the word "Jet" in the title not only refers to faster movement, but also the ability to perform forward and backward dashing. Another new addition is when two attacks hit each other, they will rebound.  The "Normal Game" and "Death Match" modes are replaced by "Entry to the tournament" and "The FORGING OF WARRIORS":

In "Entry to the tournament", the objective is to first face four groups that have three opponents per group, and defeat at least two out of three opponents per group. Second, the player must defeat Captain Kidd in at least two of three rounds. Third, the player must defeat Hanzou the same way. Finally, the player must defeat Zeus' henchmen Jack and Ryofu before defeating Zeus himself.

In "The FORGING OF WARRIORS", the player selects an opponent to fight against. Each battle against a character, like in most fighting games at the time of its release, requires the player to win two out of three rounds to completely win against the opponent. If the timer runs out before anyone is knocked out, the competitor with fuller lifebars wins. Once the player wins or loses, the player returns to the "Player Select" and "Enemy Select" screens. However, after winning against four opponents in a row, the game ends. This is the only mode in which two players can play against each other. Depending on what CPU-controlled opponent or second player's character is chosen, the stage both players will fight on will be the second character's stage from World Heroes 2; however, for characters introduced in World Heroes 2 Jet, the battle would take place on their stages exclusively shown in this mode.

Plot
After the defeat of both Dio and Neo Geegus at the end of World Heroes 2, the world was saved from the threatening danger and that the 14 fighters who had participated in the World Heroes tournament had returned to their own respective time periods. However, one year later, the 14 fighters had received invitations to a new fighting tournament known as the World Heroes Battle Fest and that this tournament would take place over the next five days in different parts of the world, being watched by millions of fighting fans. Surprisingly, the 14 fighters learn that Dr. Brown is not the one who is sponsoring the tournament, but rather, a mysterious millionaire who is known simply as Mr. Z to the public. As the 14 fighters prepare themselves for the World Heroes Battle Fest, all of them have no clue or idea that Mr. Z has his own callous ambition for world domination and with the assistance of his two loyal servants, he vows to eliminate anyone who dares to get in his ruthless way.

Characters
Returning Characters:
Hanzou Hattori
Kotaro Fuuma
Kim Dragon
Janne D'Arc
Julius Carn
Muscle Power
Brocken
Rasputin
Captain Kidd
Ryoko Izumo
Mudman
Erick
Shura Nai Khanomtom
Johnny Maximum

New Characters:
Jack (Sub-Boss)
Ryofu (Sub-Boss)
Zeus (Final Boss)

Ports and related releases
World Heroes 2 Jet was later ported to the Neo Geo AES in both Japan and North America on June 10, 1994, which is the same as the Neo Geo MVS version like nearly every AES versions of Neo Geo titles. World Heroes 2 Jet was later ported to the Neo Geo CD exclusively in Japan by ADK on November 11, 1994. Outside of SNK's platforms, it became the first and only title of the series to receive a port on a handheld, which was reprogrammed by Betop and published by Takara for the Nintendo Game Boy with Super Game Boy features added to it, as well as characters being super deformed due to the handheld platform's screen being small. The Game Boy port was later released in North America by Playmates Interactive the same year in August, but without "Nettou" added to the title.

On October 18, 2007, SNK Playmore added it along with its predecessors and successor to the arcade game compilation  in Japan for the PlayStation 2.  It was later published in North America on March 11, 2008, and in Europe on November 7, 2008, both titled as World Heroes Anthology.  This compilation was reprinted as part of a series of best-sellers subtitled "The Best" in Japan on June 18, 2009. It was also released in the Wii Virtual Console.

Reception

In Japan, Game Machine listed World Heroes 2 Jet on their June 1, 1994 issue as being the third most-successful table arcade unit of the month. In North America, RePlay reported World Heroes 2 Jet to be the fifth most-popular arcade game at the time. Play Meter also listed the game to be the twenty-eighth most-popular arcade game at the time.

On release, Electronic Gaming Monthly gave the Neo Geo version their "Game of the Month" and "Editors' Choice Gold" awards, citing the sharp graphics, stereo sound, improved controls, and large number of added features. Reviewing the Neo Geo version, GamePro praised the added tournament mode and new moves but criticized the absence of death match mode and the slow-paced gameplay, concluding that "Even though Jet has more depth than previous Heroes, it's still missing the defining elements of an SF II-quality game, such as a true four-button configuration, ... tightly balanced game play, and extremely likable characters."

Electronic Gaming Monthly and GamePro both gave the Game Boy version rave reviews, with EGM reviewer Sushi-X commenting, "I could not believe a fighting game would ever work for the portables, but this one does." Both magazines cited the sounds as the one weak point, and particularly applauded the inclusion of all the characters, the attractiveness of the graphics, and the responsiveness of the controls.

Notes

References

External links

Official sites
World Heroes at SNK Playmore
World Heroes series at NBC Museum of SNK Playmore

General resources

World Heroes 2 Jet at arcade-history
World Heroes 2 Jet at Jap-Sai

1994 video games
ACA Neo Geo games
ADK (company) games
Arcade video games
D4 Enterprise games
Fighting games
2D fighting games
Game Boy games
Neo Geo games
Neo Geo CD games
PlayStation 4 games
PlayStation Network games
SNK Playmore games
Takara video games
Video games developed in Japan
Video games scored by Hideki Yamamoto
Video games scored by Hiroaki Shimizu
Video games scored by Yuka Watanabe
Video games set in Germany
Video games set in Japan
Video games set in Korea
Video games set in Spain
Video games set in the United States
Virtual Console games
Windows games
Xbox One games
Hamster Corporation games